Phuoc Long Station (Vietnamese: Ga Phước Long) is a future elevated Ho Chi Minh City Metro station on Line 1. Located in Trường Thọ Ward, Thu Duc, Ho Chi Minh City, the station is planned to open in 2024.

References 

Ho Chi Minh City Metro stations
Railway stations scheduled to open in 2024